Macromia illinoiensis, also known as the swift river cruiser or the Illinois river cruiser, is a species of dragonfly in the family Macromiidae. It was described by Walsh in 1862.

References

Insects described in 1862
Taxa named by Benjamin Dann Walsh